Flambeau Lake is a 1,166 acre lake in Vilas County, Wisconsin, USA. The community of Lac du Flambeau completely surrounds the lake. Fish present in the lake are muskellunge, largemouth bass, smallmouth bass, northern pike and walleye. There is one boat ramp on the northeast shore, accessible from Highway 47.It has a maximum depth of 78 feet. Visitors have access to the lake from a public boat landing. Fish include Musky, Panfish, Largemouth Bass, Smallmouth Bass, Northern Pike and Walleye.

See also 
 List of lakes in Vilas County, Wisconsin
 List of lakes in Wisconsin

References

Lakes of Wisconsin
Lakes of Vilas County, Wisconsin